16 Aquarii, abbreviated 16 Aqr, is a star in the constellation of Aquarius. 16 Aquarii is the Flamsteed designation. It is a faint star, just visible to the naked eye, with an apparent visual magnitude of 5.869. It is moving closer to the Earth with a heliocentric radial velocity of −6 km/s, and is predicted to come within  in 6.8 million years.

At the estimated age of 740 million years, this is an aging giant star currently on the red giant branch with a stellar classification of G7 III. This indicates it has exhausted the supply of hydrogen at its core and is generating energy via hydrogen fusion along a shell surrounding a hot core of inert helium. The star has 2.3 times the mass of the Sun and has expanded to 8 times the Sun's radius. It is radiating 37 times the Sun's luminosity from its enlarged photosphere at an effective temperature of 5,096 K.

References

G-type giants
Aquarius (constellation)
Durchmusterung objects
Aquarii, 016
203222
105412
8160